Philip Nii Kojo Sackey (born 18 August 1996) is a Ghanaian professional footballer who plays as a right-back for Ghanaian Premier League side Accra Great Olympics.

Career 
Sackey played for then Tudu Mighty Jets before joining Accra Great Olympics in 2019. On 25 January 2020, he scored the only goal in a 1–0 win against International Allies to help Great Olympics secure their second victory of the season. During a match against Cape Coast Ebusua Dwarfs on 7 March 2020, he scored in the 86th minute to add up to a 3rd-minute penalty scored by Maxwell Nii Abbey Quaye to cement a 2–0 victory for the club. In total he made 14 league appearances and scored 2 goals in the 2019–20 Ghana Premier League season before the league was put on hold and later cancelled due to the COVID-19 pandemic.

In November 2020, ahead of the 2020–21 Ghana Premier League, he was named on the club's squad list for the season and was seen as their main right-back. He was adjudged the man of the match  in 2–0 win over city rivals Inter Allies on 15 January 2021 after helping the club keep a clean sheet and his impressive runs down the right flank which served as a threat to the opposition. He ended the first round of the season with 16 league matches.

References

External links 

 

Living people
1996 births
Association football defenders
Ghanaian footballers
Tudu Mighty Jets FC players
Accra Great Olympics F.C. players
Ghana Premier League players